Kindness is the solo project of English singer Adam Bainbridge.

History 
In 2007, Adam Bainbridge was a recipient of the Eric James Johnson Memorial Fellowship, at The Philadelphia Institute for Advance Study.

Live in Philly was released in 2007 as a free MP3 download and CDr, with no label.

In 2009, Moshi Moshi Records released Kindness debut single Swingin’ Party. Gee Up was included on the vinyl b-side and a VHS video directed by Jack Latham accompanied it.

In October 2011, Cyan was released as a limited edition 12" vinyl through Kindness's own record label Female Energy in the UK and Terrible Records in North America. The B-side contained 3 unnamed lock grooves.

Kindness's debut album, World, You Need a Change of Mind, co-produced & mixed by Grammy Award-winning producer Philippe Zdar was released on 16 March 2012. Live sessions were recorded for Radio 1's Zane Lowe and Rob da Bank as well as BBC Radio 6 Music's Lauren Laverne, Live from Maida Vale. Kindness also played the iTunes Festival 2012.

In 2013, Kindness contributed to production and instrumentation on Blood Orange's Cupid Deluxe.

On 13 October 2014, Kindness released their second album Otherness featuring contributions from Robyn, Dev Hynes, Kelela and more.

During a 2015 lecture for Red Bull Music Academy, Kindness discussed their recent music career, and their gender identity and sexuality.

'World Restart' from 2014's Otherness is the theme to the New York Times podcast, Still Processing.

Live 
As a live band, Kindness has performed at a number of festivals and headline shows through the world including South by Southwest, Latitude Festival, Printemps De Bourges, Sydney Opera House, Primavera Festival, Field Day Festival, Eurockennes, Calvi on The Rocks, Oya Festival, Way Out West, Flow Festival, Summer Sonic, Bestival, We Love Green, Les in Rocks Festival, Midi Festival, and Soulwaxmas.

In May and June 2013, Kindness supported The xx as part of their Night and Day Festival in London and Berlin.

2014 saw a North American and worldwide tour.

Kindness was a support for Blood Orange's charity concert for Opus 118 School Of Music at the Apollo Theater in New York.

DJ 
Bainbridge originally came to produce music from work as a DJ. As a DJ, Bainbridge has opened for Giorgio Moroder, Solange and Mannie Fresh, and at venues & clubs worldwide including the Guggenheim Museum, Panorama Bar, MoMA PS1, the Apollo Theater, the Met Museum, Palais de Tokyo, Rex Club, Liquidroom Tokyo and the Los Angeles Museum of Contemporary Art.

Bainbridge's mixes have featured on British and international radio, and on specialist shows, such as the long-running Beats in Space.

Journalism 
Kindness has also interviewed other artists for print media, such as interviews for Saint Heron. In May 2018, Kindness interviewed Robyn for an RBMA lecture on her career and music.

Personal life
Bainbridge identifies as gender non-conforming and uses they/them pronouns.

Amina Desai (c. 1920 – 10 June 2009) was Bainbridge's grandmother. John Blacking (1928 – 1990) was Bainbridge's uncle.

Video director 
Adam Bainbridge has directed and co-directed a number of videos for their own Kindness project as well as for other artists, including Grizzly Bear, Blood Orange, and William Onyeabor:

Discography

Studio albums
World, You Need a Change of Mind (16 March 2012)
Otherness (13 October 2014)
Something Like a War (6 September 2019)

Singles
"Swingin Party" (28 September 2009)
"Cyan" (26 October 2011)
"SEOD" (8 February 2012)
"Gee Up" (16 March 2012)
"House" (15 June 2012)
"That's Alright" (21 September 2012)
"World Restart"  (12 August 2014)
"This Is Not About Us" (4 September 2014)
"Who Do You Love?"  (2 January 2015)
"Cry Everything"  (7 March 2019)
"Lost Without"  (30 April 2019)
"Hard to Believe"  (11 June 2019)

Remixes
"Blood Orange – Uncle Ace" (Kindness remix feat. Robert Owens) (10 April 2014)
"Röyksopp & Robyn – Monument" (Kindness remix feat. Busiswa) (15 August 2014)
"Kelela – Kate for Me" (4 January 2016)
"Kelela – Wheel the High" (4 January 2016)
"Robyn – Got Her Own Thing From Sweden" (11 April 2019)
"Robyn – Chic It Immediately" (11 April 2019)
"Shivum Sharma – Diamond" (Kindness remix) (25 August 2020)

Production discography

Videos

Radio work 
In 2016–17, Bainbridge hosted a monthly show for Red Bull Music Academy.

References

External links
 
 
 Kindness on Spotify
 Kindness on Soundcloud
 

21st-century English singers
Living people
English electronic musicians
English people of Indian descent
British LGBT musicians
English LGBT musicians
Place of birth missing (living people)
Non-binary musicians
Transgender singers
Transgender musicians
LGBT DJs
LGBT record producers
Remixers
Polydor Records artists
1982 births
People with bipolar disorder
Mom + Pop Music artists